Żywiołak is a Polish folk and rock band from Warsaw.

Music 
The band incorporates folk, punk, rock, and techno musical styles, as well as the sounds of restored ancient instruments, recently invented instruments, and various archaic and modern vocal techniques.

The lyrical content of their music encompasses pre-Christian Slavic beliefs including Slavic demonology, legends, and fairy tales.

History 
The band was formed in January 2005, initially as a duo of multi-instrumentalists Robert Jaworski and Robert Wasilewski. They were soon joined by percussion specialist Maciej Dymek and singers Anucha Piotrowska and Izabella Byra. In June 2007, percussionist Maciej Dymek joined the group  and, in August 2008, Monika Sadkowska replaced Izabella Byra on vocals.

In 2008, Żywiołak was nominated for the Polish final of the 2008 Eurovision Song Contest but was ultimately disqualified for breaking contest rules.

Members 
 Robert Jaworski – hurdy gurdy, renaissance violin, lute, flute, bagpipe, viola
 Isabella Beer – vocals
 Robert Vasylevsky – bass guitar, lute, electric guitar, vocals
 Anna Piotrovska – vocals
 Maciej Dimek – drum, cymbals, percussion
 Monika Sadkovska – vocals
 Agnieszka Binek – violin, vocals

Discography 

 Muzyka psychodelicznej świtezianki (EP, 2007)
 Nowa Ex-Tradycja (2008)
 Nowa Mix-Tradycja (2010)
 Globalna wiocha (2011)
 Muzyka psychoaktywnego stolema (2016)
 Pieśni pół/nocy (2017)
 Wendzki Sznyt (2019)

References 

Polish folk groups
Polish rock music groups